Merdan Ataýew (born 8 May 1995) is a Turkmenistani swimmer.  Ataýew competed for Turkmenistan at the  2016 Summer Olympics and the 2020 Summer Olympics. International Master of Sports of Turkmenistan (2021).

Early life 
Merdan Ataýew was born on 8 May 1995 in Ashgabat. He is a student of the Turkmen State Institute of Physical Culture and Sports. He lives and trains in Ashgabat; her coach as of 2021 was Segeý Ýepifanow.

Career 
He competed in the men's 100 metre backstroke event at the 2016 Summer Olympics. He placed 33rd in the heats with a time of 56.34 seconds and did not qualify for the semifinals. He was the flagbearer for Turkmenistan during the opening ceremony.

In 2021, Merdan Ataýew qualified to represent Turkmenistan at the 2020 Summer Olympics in Tokyo, Japan, where he went on to compete in the 100 metre backstroke, and the 200 metre breaststroke events.

At the 2020 Summer Olympics, Merdan Ataýew  was chosen the flag bearer for Turkmenistan again.

Major results

References

External links
 

1995 births
Living people
Turkmenistan male swimmers
Olympic swimmers of Turkmenistan
Swimmers at the 2016 Summer Olympics
Swimmers at the 2020 Summer Olympics
Sportspeople from Ashgabat
Swimmers at the 2014 Asian Games
Swimmers at the 2018 Asian Games
Asian Games competitors for Turkmenistan
Male backstroke swimmers
Islamic Solidarity Games medalists in swimming